Mart Raud and Märt Raud may refer to:
 Mart Raud (writer) (1903–1980), Estonian writer
 Märt Raud (writer) (1881–1980), Estonian writer
 Märt Raud (engineer) (1878–1952), Estonian engineer, politician